Chanut is a given name and surname. Notable people with the name include:

Chanut Piyaoui (born 1924), Thai businesswoman and entrepreneur
Denis Gargaud Chanut (born 1987), French slalom canoeist 
Pierre Chanut (1601–1662), French state counsellor and ambassador in Sweden